Slingerlands Historic District is a national historic district located at Slingerlands, Town of Bethlehem, Albany County, New York.  It encompasses 102 contributing buildings and 1 contributing structure in the hamlet of Slingerlands.  The district developed between about 1790 and 1940, and includes notable examples of Italianate, Colonial Revival, Federal, Greek Revival, Queen Anne, Stick style, and Bungalow style architecture,  Located in the district is the John I. Slingerland home at 1575 New Scotland Road.  Other notable buildings include the Slingerlands United Methodist Church (1871) and the former schoolhouse, converted into apartments.

It was listed on the U.S. National Register of Historic Places in 2012.

References

External links 

 A Walking Tour of the Slingerlands Historic District

Historic districts on the National Register of Historic Places in New York (state)
Italianate architecture in New York (state)
Colonial Revival architecture in New York (state)
Federal architecture in New York (state)
Greek Revival architecture in New York (state)
Queen Anne architecture in New York (state)
Stick-Eastlake architecture in the United States
Historic districts in Albany County, New York
National Register of Historic Places in Albany County, New York